Lophiogobius ocellicauda is a species of freshwater goby native to China and South Korea.  This species is the only known member of its genus.

References

Gobiidae
Monotypic fish genera
Taxa named by Albert Günther